In quantum mechanics and quantum field theory, the propagator is a function that specifies the probability amplitude for a particle to travel from one place to another in a given period of time, or to travel with a certain energy and momentum. In Feynman diagrams, which serve to calculate the rate of collisions in quantum field theory, virtual particles contribute their propagator to the rate of the scattering event described by the respective diagram. These may also be viewed as the inverse of the wave operator appropriate to the particle, and are, therefore, often called (causal) Green's functions (called "causal" to distinguish it from the elliptic Laplacian Green's function).

Non-relativistic propagators
In non-relativistic quantum mechanics, the propagator gives the probability amplitude for a particle to travel from one spatial point (x') at one time (t') to another spatial point (x) at a later time (t).

Consider a system with Hamiltonian . The Green's function (fundamental solution) for the Schrödinger equation is a function
 
satisfying
 

This propagator may also be written as the transition amplitude
 
where  is the unitary time-evolution operator for the system taking states at time  to states at time .

The quantum-mechanical propagator may also be found by using a path integral:
 
where the boundary conditions of the path integral include . Here  denotes the Lagrangian of the system. The paths that are summed over move only forwards in time and are integrated with the differential  following the path in time.

In non-relativistic quantum mechanics, the propagator lets one find the wave function of a system, given an initial wave function and a time interval. The new wave function is specified by the equation
 

If  only depends on the difference , this is a convolution of the initial wave function and the propagator.

Basic examples: propagator of free particle and harmonic oscillator
For a time-translationally invariant system, the propagator only depends on the time difference , so it may be rewritten as

The propagator of a one-dimensional free particle, obtainable from, e.g., the path integral, is then

Similarly, the propagator of a one-dimensional quantum harmonic oscillator is the Mehler kernel, 

The latter may be obtained from the previous free-particle result upon making use of van Kortryk's SU(1,1) Lie-group identity,

valid for operators  and  satisfying the Heisenberg relation .

For the -dimensional case, the propagator can be simply obtained by the product

Relativistic propagators
In relativistic quantum mechanics and quantum field theory the propagators are Lorentz-invariant. They give the amplitude for a particle to travel between two spacetime points.

Scalar propagator
In quantum field theory, the theory of a free (or non-interacting) scalar field is a useful and simple example which serves to illustrate the concepts needed for more complicated theories. It describes spin-zero particles. There are a number of possible propagators for free scalar field theory. We now describe the most common ones.

Position space 
The position space propagators are Green's functions for the Klein–Gordon equation. This means that they are functions  satisfying

where
  are two points in Minkowski spacetime,
  is the d'Alembertian operator acting on the  coordinates,
  is the Dirac delta function.

(As typical in relativistic quantum field theory calculations, we use units where the speed of light  and Planck's reduced constant  are set to unity.)

We shall restrict attention to 4-dimensional Minkowski spacetime. We can perform a Fourier transform of the equation for the propagator, obtaining

This equation can be inverted in the sense of distributions, noting that the equation  has the solution (see Sokhotski–Plemelj theorem)

with  implying the limit to zero. Below, we discuss the right choice of the sign arising from causality requirements.

The solution is

where 
 
is the 4-vector inner product.

The different choices for how to deform the integration contour in the above expression lead to various forms for the propagator. The choice of contour is usually phrased in terms of the  integral.

The integrand then has two poles at 
 
so different choices of how to avoid these lead to different propagators.

Causal propagators

Retarded propagator

A contour going clockwise over both poles gives the causal retarded propagator. This is zero if  is spacelike or if  (i.e. if  is to the future of ).

This choice of contour is equivalent to calculating the limit,

Here 

is the Heaviside step function and

The expression  means  causally precedes  which, for Minkowski spacetime, means
 and 

This expression can be related to the vacuum expectation value of the commutator of the free scalar field operator,

where 

is the commutator.

Advanced propagator

A contour going anti-clockwise under both poles gives the causal advanced propagator. This is zero if  is spacelike or if  (i.e. if  is to the past of ).

This choice of contour is equivalent to calculating the limit

This expression can also be expressed in terms of the vacuum expectation value of the commutator of the free scalar field.
In this case,

Feynman propagator

A contour going under the left pole and over the right pole gives the Feynman propagator, introduced by Richard Feynman in 1948.

This choice of contour is equivalent to calculating the limit   

Here

This expression can be derived directly from the field theory as the vacuum expectation value of the time-ordered product of the free scalar field, that is, the product always taken such that the time ordering of the spacetime points is the same,

The usual derivation is to insert a complete set of single-particle momentum states between the fields with Lorentz covariant normalization, and then to show that the  functions providing the causal time ordering may be obtained by a contour integral along the energy axis, if the integrand is as above (hence the infinitesimal imaginary part), to move the pole off the real line.

The propagator may also be derived using the path integral formulation of quantum theory.

Momentum space propagator
The Fourier transform of the position space propagators can be thought of as propagators in momentum space. These take a much simpler form than the position space propagators.

They are often written with an explicit  term although this is understood to be a reminder about which integration contour is appropriate (see above). This  term is included to incorporate boundary conditions and causality (see below).

For a 4-momentum  the causal and Feynman propagators in momentum space are:

Faster than light?

The Feynman propagator has some properties that seem baffling at first. In particular, unlike the commutator, the propagator is nonzero outside of the light cone, though it falls off rapidly for spacelike intervals. Interpreted as an amplitude for particle motion, this translates to the virtual particle travelling faster than light. It is not immediately obvious how this can be reconciled with causality: can we use faster-than-light virtual particles to send faster-than-light messages?

The answer is no: while in classical mechanics the intervals along which particles and causal effects can travel are the same, this is no longer true in quantum field theory, where it is commutators that determine which operators can affect one another.

So what does the spacelike part of the propagator represent? In QFT the vacuum is an active participant, and particle numbers and field values are related by an uncertainty principle; field values are uncertain even for particle number zero. There is a nonzero probability amplitude to find a significant fluctuation in the vacuum value of the field  if one measures it locally (or, to be more precise, if one measures an operator obtained by averaging the field over a small region). Furthermore, the dynamics of the fields tend to favor spatially correlated fluctuations to some extent. The nonzero time-ordered product for spacelike-separated fields then just measures the amplitude for a nonlocal correlation in these vacuum fluctuations, analogous to an EPR correlation.  Indeed, the propagator is often called a two-point correlation function for the free field.

Since, by the postulates of quantum field theory, all observable operators commute with each other at spacelike separation, messages can no more be sent through these correlations than they can through any other EPR correlations; the correlations are in random variables.

Regarding virtual particles, the propagator at spacelike separation can be thought of as a means of calculating the amplitude for creating a virtual particle-antiparticle pair that eventually disappears into the vacuum, or for detecting a virtual pair emerging from the vacuum.  In Feynman's language, such creation and annihilation processes are equivalent to a virtual particle wandering backward and forward through time, which can take it outside of the light cone.  However, no signaling back in time is allowed.

Explanation using limits
This can be made clearer by writing the propagator in the following form for a massless photon:

Then the rule is that one only takes the limit  at the end of a calculation.

One sees that 

and

Hence this means that a single photon will always stay on the light cone. It is also shown that the total probability for a photon at any time must be normalised by the reciprocal of the following factor:

We see that the parts outside the light cone usually are zero in the limit and only are important in Feynman diagrams.

Propagators in Feynman diagrams
The most common use of the propagator is in calculating probability amplitudes for particle interactions using Feynman diagrams.  These calculations are usually carried out in momentum space. In general, the amplitude gets a factor of the propagator for every internal line, that is, every line that does not represent an incoming or outgoing particle in the initial or final state. It will also get a factor proportional to, and similar in form to, an interaction term in the theory's Lagrangian for every internal vertex where lines meet.  These prescriptions are known as Feynman rules.

Internal lines correspond to virtual particles. Since the propagator does not vanish for combinations of energy and momentum disallowed by the classical equations of motion, we say that the virtual particles are allowed to be off shell. In fact, since the propagator is obtained by inverting the wave equation, in general, it will have singularities on shell.

The energy carried by the particle in the propagator can even be negative. This can be interpreted simply as the case in which, instead of a particle going one way, its antiparticle is going the other way, and therefore carrying an opposing flow of positive energy.  The propagator encompasses both possibilities.  It does mean that one has to be careful about minus signs for the case of fermions, whose propagators are not even functions in the energy and momentum (see below).

Virtual particles conserve energy and momentum. However, since they can be off shell, wherever the diagram contains a closed loop, the energies and momenta of the virtual particles participating in the loop will be partly unconstrained, since a change in a quantity for one particle in the loop can be balanced by an equal and opposite change in another. Therefore, every loop in a Feynman diagram requires an integral over a continuum of possible energies and momenta. In general, these integrals of products of propagators can diverge, a situation that must be handled by the process of renormalization.

Other theories

Spin  
If the particle possesses spin then its propagator is in general somewhat more complicated, as it will involve the particle's spin or polarization indices. The differential equation satisfied by the propagator for a spin  particle is given by

where  is the unit matrix in four dimensions, and employing the Feynman slash notation. This is the Dirac equation for a delta function source in spacetime. Using the momentum representation,

the equation becomes

 

where on the right-hand side an integral representation of the four-dimensional delta function is used. Thus

By multiplying from the left with

(dropping unit matrices from the notation) and using properties of the gamma matrices,

the momentum-space propagator used in Feynman diagrams for a Dirac field representing the electron in quantum electrodynamics is found to have form

The  downstairs is a prescription for how to handle the poles in the complex -plane. It automatically yields the Feynman contour of integration by shifting the poles appropriately. It is sometimes written

for short. "One over matrix" is otherwise nonsensical. In position space one has

This is related to the Feynman propagator by

where .

Spin 1 
The propagator for a gauge boson in a gauge theory depends on the choice of convention to fix the gauge. For the gauge used by Feynman and Stueckelberg, the propagator for a photon is

The propagator for a massive vector field can be derived from the Stueckelberg Lagrangian.

The name of the propagator, however, refers to its final form and not necessarily to the value of the gauge parameter.

Unitary gauge:

Feynman ('t Hooft) gauge:

Landau (Lorenz) gauge:

Graviton propagator
The graviton propagator for Minkowski space in general relativity is 

The graviton propagator for (Anti) de Sitter space is 

where  is the Hubble constant.

Related singular functions

The scalar propagators are Green's functions for the Klein–Gordon equation. There are related singular functions which are important in quantum field theory. We follow the notation in Bjorken and Drell. See also Bogolyubov and Shirkov (Appendix A). These functions are most simply defined in terms of the vacuum expectation value of products of field operators.

Solutions to the Klein–Gordon equation

Pauli–Jordan function
The commutator of two scalar field operators defines the Pauli–Jordan function  by

with

This satisfies 
 
and is zero if .

Positive and negative frequency parts (cut propagators)

This allows us to define the positive frequency part:

and the negative frequency part:

These satisfy 

and

Auxiliary function
The anti-commutator of two scalar field operators defines  function by

with

This satisfies

Green's functions for the Klein–Gordon equation
The retarded, advanced and Feynman propagators defined above are all Green's functions for the Klein–Gordon equation.

They are related to the singular functions by

Notes

References
 (Appendix C.)
 (Especially pp. 136–156 and Appendix A)
 (section Dynamical Theory of Groups & Fields, Especially pp. 615–624)

  (Has useful appendices of Feynman diagram rules, including propagators, in the back.)

Scharf, G. (1995). Finite Quantum Electrodynamics, The Causal Approach. Springer. .

External links 
 Three Methods for Computing the Feynman Propagator

Quantum mechanics
Quantum field theory
Theoretical physics
Mathematical physics